Dover was a short 1942 film produced by the British Ministry of Information. It concerns the town of Dover, the most likely "frontline" in any potential German invasion and how it had persevered since 1940.

The film, which stars Edward R. Murrow, opens with a look back at the circumstances of mid-1940, how the British had arrived there after Dunkirk, the continuous air raids during the battle of Britain, and the stoicism of the people as they prepared to "die with their boots on" when the invasion came. Now, two years later, Dover is still the front line, but not for defence, for offence. RAF planes control the skies and more Allied sorties are flown over German targets than German raids on Britain. The people have stoically and bravely gone on with their normal lives, while helping the war effort; most of the men are in the forces, while the women man the anti-aircraft guns. The film ends with the narrator promising that someday soon, barges will leave Britain's shore to liberate Europe.

See also 
 List of Allied propaganda films of World War II

External links 
 
 

1942 short films
1942 documentary films
Black-and-white documentary films
Documentary films about military aviation
Battle of Britain films
British World War II propaganda shorts
British documentary films
British black-and-white films
Paramount Pictures short films